Saint-Lumier-en-Champagne (literally Saint-Lumier in Champagne) is a commune in the Marne department in north-eastern France.

See also
Communes of the Marne department

References

Saintlumierenchampagne